The Ancient Ferrous Metallurgy Sites of Burkina Faso are a collection of ancient metallurgy sites across five locations in the Nord and Centre-Nord regions of Burkina Faso, used to extract iron from ore. The oldest of these structures are dated from roughly 800 BC, making them the most ancient known examples of metallurgy in Burkina Faso. In 2019, the sites were registered as a World Heritage Site by UNESCO, because of the exemplary evidence of ancient metalworking.

Description
The five metalworking complexes that make up the World Heritage Site are located around the towns of Douroula, Tiwêga, Yamané, Kindibo, and Békuy. All together, there are 15 natural draft furnace ruins across the five sites, with smaller furnaces, mines and dwellings surrounding them. The natural draft furnaces reach up to five meters in height and are direct-induction, only requiring ambient airflow to operate.  The other, smaller furnaces would have required the use of bellows to operate. Whereas the large, natural-draught furnaces are only found in those regions of Burkina Faso, the smaller furnaces are found throughout the country.

The Tiwêga site, located 5 kilometers to the west of Kaya, contains three direct-induction furnaces built in the shape of truncated cones. Based on oral traditions, these furnaces may have been built between the 15th and 18th centuries, still being used during Burkina Faso's colonial period, although more archeological research is needed to precisely date the furnaces.

The Yamané and Kindibo sites also contain multiple large furnaces built in a similar manner. These furnaces have been dated to the 13–14th and 10–11th centuries, respectively. The smaller, surrounding furnaces are much newer, being built after the 15th century.

The furnaces at this site are much older (500–400 BC) and are partially underground, requiring the use of a bellows. 

The oldest furnaces within this site are found at the Douroula site, with the metalworks there dated to the 8th century BC. This site contains the oldest known record of iron metallurgy in Burkina Faso.  

With the invasion and colonization of Burkina Faso in the 1890s by the French, and the subsequent formation of the Upper Volta colony, the use of these ancient furnaces waned.  However, iron is still extracted and worked in the region.

References 

World Heritage Sites in Burkina Faso
Archaeological sites in Burkina Faso
Archaeology of Western Africa